Eduard Krüger (?–?) was an Estonian politician. He was a member of III Riigikogu. On 22 June 1926, he resigned his position and he was replaced by Carl Schilling.

References

Members of the Riigikogu, 1926–1929